Sra Dhaka is a village in the Balochistan province of Pakistan. It is located at 30°28'0N 69°31'60E with an altitude of 1353 meters (4442 feet).

References

Populated places in Kalat District